Wilhelm Josef "Willy" Schaeffler (13 December 1915 – 9 April 1988) was a German-American skiing champion, winning coach, and ski resort developer. In skiing, he is best known to the public for his intensive training programs that led the U.S. Ski Team to gold and bronze medals at the 1972 Olympics and his success at the University of Denver. In development circles, he is known for his role in the development of Vail and Whistler Blackcomb, and his efforts to build Mineral King and Independence Lake in California.

Early years 

Schaeffler was born in Kaufbeuren, Bavaria, on 13 December 1915. Working in the mountains as a shepherd, he was a competitive skier by age eight. In 1932, at age sixteen, he was the winner of the Bavarian Alpine Championships. Schaeffler was named to the German Olympic team for 1936, but broke both legs before the IV Winter Games in Garmisch-Partenkirchen, and was unable to compete.

World War II 
When World War II broke out in 1939, Schaeffler was drafted into the German Army as a "political unsafe," because of a family history of opposition politics, and eventually ended up  on the Russian Front. Captured and tortured by the Soviets, he escaped and made it west to Austria, where after recovering from grave injuries, he joined the anti-Nazi resistance, known as the Austrian Underground, with forces working in the Austrian Alps.

Following the war, Schaeffler trained the United States Army Europe in rock climbing and alpine skiing, and in this role taught General George Patton and other high-ranking U.S. military personnel how to ski and rock climb. This, and his romance with American Betty Durnford, his future wife of 14 years, was his ticket to United States emigration; he moved to the U.S. with Betty under her sponsorship in the spring of 1948.

United States

Instructor
In June 1948, Schaeffler wrote to Larry Jump, who was setting up the Arapahoe Basin ski area in Colorado, looking for work as a ski instructor. Jump hired Schaeffler, who moved with his new wife to Colorado that year and introduced the alpine skiing technique known as "short-swing," which remained the standard beginner training technique across North America for decades. In late 1957, Sports Illustrated featured Schaeffler and parts of this new technique in a two-issue cover story, titled "Revolution In Skiing." The article featured remarkable pencil drawings by renowned artist and content innovator Robert Riger.

University of Denver
Schaeffler was hired for his second job at the University of Denver; he was the coach of the
Pioneers ski team from 1948–1970 and was also the coach of its soccer team from 1962–1969. Under his tutelage, in 22 years, his D.U. Pioneers won 13 of 18 NCAA national championships, which began with the inaugural edition in 1954.

In general competition, Denver placed in the top three 122 times out of 123 meets, with 100 of those being first-place. This record of wins and places stands unchallenged in the world to this day. Thirty-three of his racers were named to the NCAA All-American teams, and fifteen to Olympic and World Championship teams. Otto Tschudi, Marv Crawford, Keith Wegeman, and Chuck Ferries are among his premier Pioneers.

Design
In 1957, Schaeffler became the Director of Ski Events for the 1960 Winter Olympics in Squaw Valley, California, and was responsible for designing the alpine courses. It was here that he began his lifelong friendships and associations with both John F. Kennedy and Walt Disney.

In the early 1970s, Schaeffler was part of the group that submitted the winning bid for the 1976 Winter Olympics for Denver in 1970; but this bid was withdrawn by the voters of Colorado in late 1972, and the games returned to Innsbruck in 1976 for a second time in twelve years. Schaeffler's work on the design of the runs at Squaw Valley had placed him in high demand around across North America and around the world as a ski area and ski run designer, and over the next two and a half decades, he consulted with dozens of ski resorts. One of these was the original plan for what is today the Whistler Blackcomb resort, site of the alpine events of the 2010 Winter Olympics. His design for the downhill course, later named for Dave Murray, was used decades later as the main alpine course for those games.

Administrator
In 1970, Schaeffler was named as Director of the U.S. Alpine Ski Team; Schaeffler held this position until 1973. During this period, he served as head coach for the U.S. team at the 1972 Winter Olympics in Sapporo, Japan, where the women's team won gold and bronze medals. Not surprisingly, Schaeffler was often referred to as "America's Most Successful Ski Coach".

Schaeffler was largely responsible for moving the U.S. National Ski Team to its permanent headquarters in Park City, Utah, in 1974 and established the first national ski training center here. He laid out large parts of the area, including several runs on Ski Team Ridge, known as the U.S. Ski Team training runs.  Today, a ski run is named in his honor at Park City, called "Willy's Run." Another run in Beaver Creek, Colorado, called "Willy's Face," is also dedicated to the memory of Schaeffler. A third, in the ski area Willy Schaeffler helped found, Arapahoe Basin, in Colorado, also bears his name, titled "Pioneer Willy." Especially in his work as a technical delegate for the International Ski Federation (FIS), Schaeffler was passionate about ski and ski racing safety.

Schaeffler developed a special intensive training program for his skiers, plus he planned and proposed a sports medicine program, and a traveling medical team for his athletes. Schaeffler was also one of the founders of Professional Ski Instructors of America (PSIA), separating instructor training within the USSA into an independent organization.

Developer
During the 1970s, Schaeffler worked with Walt Disney, in an effort to open new ski resorts. The first project, in Mineral King, expanded greatly during design and was eventually planned to host more than a million visitors a year. The Sierra Club objected and a lengthy series of court cases followed, until the Disney organization finally gave up on the idea, citing costs and delays, following Disney's death in late 1966. A second attempt followed at Independence Lake near Mt. Lola in northern California, just north and not far from Lake Tahoe. A similar series of environmental lawsuits followed, and these plans were also abandoned, along with much of Disney's interest in the ski market.

Awards
In 1968, Schaeffler received USSA's highest award for outstanding service to the sport of skiing, named the Julius Blegen Award. The next year, he received the USSA Rocky Mountain Division's highest award, the Halstead Trophy, for outstanding service. Schaeffler was inducted into Colorado Sports Hall of Fame in 1972 and the National Ski Hall of Fame two years later. In 1977, he assisted in the formation of the Special Olympics, focused on disabled skiers, along with Arapahoe Basin's Larry and Marnie Jump, and the Kennedy family.

Legacy
At age 72, Schaeffler died at St. Luke's hospital in Denver in April 1988, after enduring five open-heart surgical procedures and a pacemaker implanted over the previous seventeen years. Established by his son Jimmy, a permanent set of scholarships at the University of Denver today pays further tribute to Schaeffler. One is a foreign exchange scholarship for disabled student-athletes, with a preference for competitive skiers; the other is a foreign exchange scholarship for able-bodied student athletes, also with a preference for competitive skiers; a third is the Willy Schaeffler Norwegian Scholarship Fund. Currently, an additional Willy Schaeffler endowment fund is in its early stages, a ski coach's fund supporting the head alpine coach at the University of Denver.

References

Notes

In 1986, the Willy Schaeffler Scholarship Fund was created at D.U. by Willy's son, Jimmy Schaeffler. The fund provides full scholarships for disabled and able-bodied ski athletes.

Bibliography

(Jump), "Arapahoe Basin Records", Denver Library
(Coach), "Schaeffler to coach U.S. national skiers", The Montreal Gazette, 26 May 1970
(Plaque), "Markers and Monuments Database: Wilheim "Willy" Schaeffler", Utah Department of Community and Culture
(Fame), "Wilhelm Josef "Willy" Schaeffler 1915–1988", Colorado Ski and Snowboard Hall of Fame
(Fund), "Willy Schaeffler Scholarship Fund Benefits Disabled Scholar-Athletes", Denver Pioneers, 19 May 2009
(Walking), "2010 Village Olympic Walking Tour", Whistler Museum & Archives Society

External links

Colorado Sports Hall of Fame – Willy Schaeffler
 

1915 births
1988 deaths
German emigrants to the United States
People from Kaufbeuren
Sportspeople from Swabia (Bavaria)
Denver Pioneers men's soccer coaches
American soccer coaches
German Army personnel of World War II
German prisoners of war in World War II held by the Soviet Union